The 1999 Singapore Open (also known as the Konica Cup) was a five-star badminton tournament that took place at the Singapore Indoor Stadium in Singapore, from August 23 to August 29, 1999. The total prize money on offer was US$150,000.

Venue
Singapore Indoor Stadium

Final results

References

Singapore Open (badminton)
Singapore
1999 in Singaporean sport